Sæbø is a former municipality in the old Hordaland county, Norway.  The  municipality existed from 1924 until its dissolution in 1964. It was located in what is now Alver Municipality in Vestland county. It occupied the southern part of the island of Radøy, some small areas on the Lindås peninsula, and some small areas on the island of Holsnøy. The administrative centre of the municipality was the village of Sæbø, where Sæbø Church is located.

History
The municipality of Sæbø was created on 1 July 1924 when the old municipality of Manger was split into three municipalities: Hordabø, Manger, and Sæbø.  Initially, Sæbø had a population of 1,125.

During the 1960s, there were many municipal mergers across Norway due to the work of the Schei Committee. On 1 January 1964, the municipality was dissolved and a merged with the following places to form the new Radøy Municipality.
most of Sæbø Municipality, except the Titland area on the Lindås peninsula (population: 916)
all Hordabø Municipality (population: 1,679)
all Manger Municipality (population: 1,344)
the island of Bognøy from Herdla Municipality (population: 29)
the Sletta area on the island of Radøy from Lindås Municipality (population: 305)
the Straume area on the island of Radøy and the small island of Fesøy from Austrheim Municipality (population: 56)

Government
The municipal council  of Sæbø was made up of 13 representatives that were elected to four year terms.  The party breakdown of the final municipal council was as follows:

See also
List of former municipalities of Norway

References

Alver (municipality)
Former municipalities of Norway
1924 establishments in Norway
1964 disestablishments in Norway